Parascorpaena poseidon, or Poseidon’s scorpionfish, is a species of marine ray-finned fish belonging to the family Scorpaenidae, the scorpionfishes. It is found around Taiwan. This species reaches a length of 
.

References

poseidon
Taxa named by Tak-Kei Chou 
Taxa named by Te-Yu Liao
Fish described in 2022